Bátonyterenye is a town in Nógrád county, in Northern Hungary. The town is the part of the Novohrad-Nógrád Geopark. 

Bátonyterenye was created in 1984 by the unification of the three villages of Nagybátony, Kisterenye, and Szúpatak. The new settlement became a town in 1989. Bátonyterenye was described as a typical socialist mining city.

Twin towns – sister cities

Bátonyterenye is twinned with:
 Fiľakovo, Slovakia
 Giresun, Turkey
 Jirkov, Czech Republic
 Kobylnica, Poland

References

External links
 
Official website in Hungarian and English
Street map 
Novohrad-Nógrád UNESCO Global Geopark

Populated places in Nógrád County
Socialist planned cities
Planned cities in Hungary
Novohrad-Nógrád UNESCO Global Geopark